Mehran Ghasemi (born November 11, 1991 in Tehran, Iran) is an Iranian football midfielder, who currently plays for Rah Ahan FC in Persian Gulf Pro League.

Club career statistics

Last updated  10 October 2014

Honours
Esteghlal
Iran Pro League (1): 2012–13
Zob Ahan
Iran Pro League (1): 2013–14
Giti Pasand
Azadegan League (1): 2014–15
Rah Ahan FC
Iran Pro League (1): 2015–16

References

External links
 Mehran Ghasemi at Persian League
 

Iranian footballers
Living people
Steel Azin F.C. players
Esteghlal F.C. players
1991 births
Association football midfielders